Reylina Gustavo Nicolas (born December 19, 1945) is a Filipino politician. A member of Lakas-CMD, she has been elected to three terms as the Mayor of Santa Maria, Bulacan from 1992 to 2001 and three terms as a Member of the House of Representatives of the Philippines, representing the Fourth District of Bulacan from 2001 to 2010.

References

 

People from Santa Maria, Bulacan
1945 births
Living people
Lakas–CMD (1991) politicians
Members of the House of Representatives of the Philippines from Bulacan
Mayors of places in Bulacan
Women mayors of places in the Philippines
Women members of the House of Representatives of the Philippines